was a Japanese author of I novels. Kanji of his real name was 外村 茂, but it was same reading as the pen name.

Tonomura was born into a conservative merchant's family in Shiga Prefecture and raised by devout parents who believed in Pure Land Buddhism. After graduation from the University of Tokyo with a degree in economics, he took over the family business as a wholesale cotton merchant. His house in Gokashōkondō-chō, Higashiōmi, is now a museum that reflects Ōmi Province merchant life.

In 1933 Tonomura handed over control of the business to his brother and began to write seriously. He received the 1956 Noma Literary Prize for Ikada (筏) and the 1960 Yomiuri Prize for Miotsukushi (澪標). Tonomura was good friends with Motojirō Kajii.

References 
PhotoGuide: Gokasho Omi Merchant Homes 五個荘 近江商人屋敷
 Yoshikazu Kataoka, Introduction to Contemporary Japanese Literature: 1956-1970, Kokusai Bunka Shinkokai, University of Tokyo Press, 1972, pages 252-254.
 Donald Keene, Dawn to the West: Japanese literature of the modern era, fiction, Volume 1, Columbia University Press, 2nd edition, 1998, page 532. .
 Dharma world, Kosei Pub. Co., volume 14-15, 1987.

1902 births
1961 deaths
Japanese writers
Yomiuri Prize winners
Writers from Shiga Prefecture